The Paul L. Foster School of Medicine is a medical school in El Paso, Texas at Texas Tech University Health Sciences Center El Paso. The Paul L. Foster School of Medicine is the 9th medical school in the state of Texas, and the medical school is the first one to open in almost four decades.  As a result of the numerous financial donations, as well as state funds, The Paul L. Foster School of Medicine has the ability to expand, construct new buildings and hospitals, purchase elaborate training equipment, and hire nationally respected professors. This academic staff is able to train current students through the utilization of state of the art educational and skill enhancing technologies that are considered to be pioneering the medical education process for the next several decades. An example of this ability is demonstrated through the advanced technologies employed in their large Clinical Simulation Center.

History
In November 2007 The Paul L. Foster School of Medicine celebrated a ribbon cutting for the second of the three buildings that will compose the medical school. This building was the Medical Education Building (MEB) of the Paul L. Foster School of Medicine at Texas Tech University Health Sciences Center. According to their website, the MEB is a four story building with "125,000 sq. ft., and includes a student services area, cafeteria, food prep area, classrooms, a library, evaluation areas, small group rooms, clinical skills areas, a simulation room, basic science labs and a gross anatomy lab. The first four-year medical school class is anticipated to be seated in August 2009."

Curriculum
The Paul L. Foster School of Medicine curriculum is designed in a way where the medical students at the school will take four classes at the same time during their first two clinical science years. These core classes are scientific principles of medicine; society, community and individual; medical skills; and a masters' colloquium.

As compared to other medical education programs that stress months of studying microbiology and human anatomy, the curriculum is designed so that students will learn about symptoms such as ear infection, chest pain, shortness of breath, and stomach pain. They will need to identify the cause and the details of each cause and symptom. Through this process the relevant anatomy, microbiology, biochemistry, as well as the other traditional subjects will be integrated into the cases presentations of the 120 clinical scenarios.

Because the USMLE Step 1 incorporates many clinical vignettes when testing the medical student's knowledge, it is believed that such a curriculum will result in much higher scores per student as compared to other Texas Medical Education Programs. Data regarding this belief will only be available after the first several groups of medical students have been educated through the Paul L. Foster School.

Departments

 Anesthesiology
 Emergency Medicine
 Family Medicine and Community Health
 Internal Medicine
 Neurology
 Obstetrics/Gynecology
 Ophthalmology
 Orthopaedic Surgery and Rehabilitation
 Pathology
 Pediatrics
 Psychiatry
 Radiology
 Surgery
 Garbar Breast Care Center

Affiliated institutions
 Graduate School of Biomedical Sciences at Texas Tech University Health Sciences Center El Paso
 Gayle Greve Hunt School of Nursing
 University Medical Center (El Paso, Texas) formerly Thomason Hospital
 William Beaumont Army Medical Center
 El Paso Psychiatric Center
 VA Clinics

Other facts

• The TTUHSC has had a regional campus at this location since 1973 and has been training a large number of 3rd and 4th year medical students since this time. The facility now has approximately 1,200 faculty and staff members. For its first 35 years, only third- and fourth-year medical students, along with residents, could train in the campus's eight accredited programs. However, in February 2008, the school received full accreditation, allowing it to accept first- and second-year medical students into its postgraduate medical training.

• The curriculum is designed to integrate basic and clinical sciences from the 1st year onward.

This facility is considered state of the art and employs the newest teaching technologies.

• TTUHSC Paul L. Foster School of Medicine was ranked on the top 10 best cities for medical schools in premedlife magazine.

• In 1998, TTUHSC El Paso celebrated 25 years serving the El Paso community. The following year, then-Texas Tech System Chancellor
John T. Montford shared with the Board of Regents a vision for a full-fledged four-year medical school in El Paso to help alleviate a severe
shortage of physicians in the area. Currently, there are less than 110 physicians for every 100,000 people in El Paso. The national average is
198 physicians per 100,000 patients. The Texas average is only 150 per 100,000. Studies have shown that most medical students remain in
the region in which they received their education to establish their practices. The addition of the first two years of the medical school would
allow students from El Paso and nearby regions to complete their education near home, in hopes of retaining doctors in the area.

• In 2001, longtime community philanthropists J.O. and Marlene Stewart donated 10.2 acres of land near the HSC for the new medical
campus. The Paso del Norte Foundation approved a $1.25 million scholarship grant program for local students contingent on the
approval of the four-year medical school.

• During the 2001 Texas Legislative Session (77th), the El Paso legislative delegation successfully spearheaded an effort to secure $40
million in tuition revenue bonds for the research facility, one of three buildings on the new campus, just a short walk from the Texas
Tech University Health Sciences Center—as well as an $11 million clinic expansion project that took about two years, and added a
third floor on the present TTUHSC El Paso Medical Center building.

• In 2002, the Paso del Norte Health Foundation announced a $1.25 million scholarship/grant loan program for TTUHSC El Paso
students choosing to practice in El Paso. By working together with TTUHSC, the Foundation would help meet the demand for
physicians and provide the perfect environment for area students to improve their medical education, while contributing to the health
of our region.

• In 2003, Texas Governor Rick Perry visited the El Paso campus for a ceremonial signing of House Bill 28, article 10, which
authorized Texas Tech to issue $45 million in tuition revenue bonds for the construction of a classroom/office building for a four-year
medical school at the El Paso campus. The governor also announced an additional $2 million in funding to finance start-up costs
and faculty salaries.

• TTUHSC El Paso Regional Dean Jose Manuel de la Rosa, M.D., was also appointed by President George W. Bush to the United
States-Mexico Border Health Commission, recognizing TTUHSC as a national leader in border health issues. The bi-national
commission developed and coordinated actions to improve the health and quality of life along the United States-Mexico border and
studied ways to solve the border’s health problems, a mission that mirrors that of TTUHSC El Paso.

• On December 9, 2003, the ground breaking for El Paso Medical Science Building I took place, and two years later in January 2006, a ribbon cutting followed. The 93,000 square-foot facility houses research on diabetes, cancer, environmental health and
infectious diseases, as well as a repository dedicated to data on Hispanic health and a genomic facility to link hereditary diseases in
families.

References

Patient simulator in the Advanced Teaching and Assessment in Clinical Simulation(ATACS)Center.

External links
 

Medical schools in Texas
Texas Tech University Health Sciences Center El Paso schools
Educational institutions established in 2007
Universities and colleges accredited by the Southern Association of Colleges and Schools
Buildings and structures in El Paso, Texas
2007 establishments in Texas